Achille Carrillo (1818 – 1880) was an Italian painter, active depicting landscapes but also religious subjects, and is considered one of the artists of the School of Posillipo.

He was born in Avellino and died in Naples. After initially studying law, he studied at the Neapolitan Academy of Fine Arts under Gabriele Smargiassi. Among his pupils was Francesco Tessitore.

References

19th-century Italian painters
Italian male painters
1818 births
1880 deaths
Painters from Naples
Italian landscape painters
Accademia di Belle Arti di Napoli alumni
19th-century Italian male artists